Balki may refer to:

Bałki, a village in Poland
R. Balki, Indian film director and advertising executive
Balki Bartokomous, a fictional character on the television show Perfect Strangers
Balki 'the Young' Pálsson, a character in the Old Norse saga Hákonar saga Hákonarsonar

See also
Balkhi (disambiguation)